Lee Township is one of the fourteen townships of Carroll County, Ohio, United States. As of the 2020 census, the population was 1,022.

Geography
Located in the southeastern part of the county, it borders the following townships:
Washington Township - north
Fox Township - northeast
Springfield Township, Jefferson County - east
Loudon Township - south
Perry Township - southwest
Union Township - west
Center Township - northwest

No municipalities are located in Lee Township, although the unincorporated community of Harlem Springs lies in the township's center

Name and history
Statewide, other Lee Townships are located in Athens and Monroe counties.

At the March, 1836, meeting of the county commissioners the entry made was: "After reading and considering the petition for the erection and alteration of several townships in different parts of the county the following is moved", "A township named Lee was ordered to be erected from parts of the townships of Rock and Jefferson."

Government

The township is governed by a three-member board of trustees, who are elected in November of odd-numbered years to a four-year term beginning on the following January 1. Two are elected in the year after the presidential election and one is elected in the year before it. There is also an elected township fiscal officer, who serves a four-year term beginning on April 1 of the year after the election, which is held in November of the year before the presidential election. Vacancies in the fiscal officership or on the board of trustees are filled by the remaining trustees.

Education
Students attend the Carrollton Exempted Village School District.

References

External links
County website

Townships in Carroll County, Ohio
Townships in Ohio